The Masonic Temple is a three-storey ballroom building located at 986 Ouellette Avenue in Windsor, Ontario, Canada. It was designed by James Carlisle Pennington in a Neo-Classical Revival style and was given heritage designation by the City of Windsor in 1994.

The building serves as a home to various masonic organizations as well as a ballroom. As well, it hosts the Windsor Scottish Rite Learning Center which provides tutoring to individuals with dyslexia.

References 

Masonic buildings in Canada
Ballrooms
Buildings and structures in Windsor, Ontario
Buildings and structures completed in 1922
1922 establishments in Ontario